The Principality of Aigues-Mortes (French: Principauté d'Aigues-Mortes) is a micronation that claims the city of Aigues-Mortes. It is not recognised by any country or government.

Aigues-Mortes was founded in 2010 as a humorous parody of the Principality of Monaco, to gain media attention and boost tourism. The micronation is also registered in France as the organisation LOUPAM. Together with local merchants and the tourist office of Aigues-Mortes, it created the BPAM (Bourse princière d'Aigues-Mortes) to handle currency exchange with the local currency, the flamant.

Aigues-Mortes was present at several international conferences on micronations, in Perugia (2015), Aigues-Mortes as organisor (2016), Atlanta (2017) and Vincennes (2018).

Legitimizing claims 
Legitimacy is based on a local legend:

In 1240, Louis IX of France obtained the town and the surrounding lands by exchange of properties with the monks of the abbey to whom the city belonged so far. Aigues-Mortes was the city from which Louis IX twice departed for the Seventh Crusade in 1248 and for the Eighth Crusade in 1270, during which he died of dysentery at Tunis. A legend says that the dying King had a faithful squire named Pierrot Pitchoun. The dying king granted him the title Prince of Aigues-Mortes, the squire's hometown, as a reward for faithful service during his last days. The current Prince is Jean-Pierre IV who is purported to be the 22nd of this princely line.

See also 
 Aigues-Mortes
 List of micronations
 Flags of micronations

References

External links 

Micronations in France
Territorial disputes of France